The Head of Eutropius is a mid 5th century marble bust, usually identified as Eutropius, consul in 399. Discovered in Ephesus, it is now inv. 1880 in the Kunsthistorisches Museum in Vienna.

The identification of its subject is traditional but probably correct, since its style is that of studios in Ephesus or Aphrodisias, which during the 5th century produced more intensely expressive works influenced by the classicising style of Theodosian art. It also marks a late phase in the theme of bearded philosophers' heads which originated in 5th century BC Athens, all with a fixed and intense gaze and wavy flowing hair. The excavation context and the work's style both place it between around 425 and 450.

References

5th-century Roman sculptures
Sculptures of the Kunsthistorisches Museum
Late Roman Empire sculptures
Classical antiquities of the Kunsthistorisches Museum
Busts (sculpture)